Roynon is a surname. Notable people with the surname include:

Adam Roynon (born 1988), British motorcycle speedway rider
Walter Roynon, 16th-century English politician